Periploca repanda is a moth in the family Cosmopterigidae. It was described by Ronald W. Hodges in 1978. It is found in North America, where it has been recorded from Texas, Arizona and California.

The wingspan is about 13 mm. Adults have been recorded on wing in September.

References

Moths described in 1978
Chrysopeleiinae
Taxa named by Ronald W. Hodges
Moths of North America